Sahyādrikhaṇḍa or Sahyadri Khand, written in Sanskrit, and is considered as part of Skandapurāṇa. One of its interpolated versions from 1700CE contains the legend of the origin of the Brahmin identities like Chitpavan Brahmins and Saraswat Brahmins while deliberately slandering authentic Brahmin communities like Karhade Brahmins.

The Sahyadri-khanda includes disparate texts that date from 5th to 13th centuries, and have been organized as part of a single text relatively recently.

Description
There is an elaborate description about the creation of Paraśurāma kṣetra. In one place the land is stated to have been created by Paraśurāma by shooting an arrow, while in another place the land is created by throwing an axe. Experts in the field of Archaeology feel that the place where Parashurama's arrow landed is believed to be the present day Goa. The Kannaḍa version contains a brief chapter called as Grāmapaddhati which describes Brāhmaṇa family names and villages, contradicting the original text that describes narrations and stories of different types of fallen Brāhmaṇas. According to Y.C.Bhānumati the Kannaḍa version has no similarities with Sanskrit Sahyādrikhaṇḍa. Many other versions are found in Marāṭhī, Hindi and English.

Chapters
Sanskrit Sahyādrikhaṇḍa contains following chapters, most of the which vary from version to version as it is a part of Skandapurāṇa.

In this article the original Sanskrit names of the chapters have been omitted.

The chapters are as follows:
The origin of Chitpāvana Brāhmaṇas (Sanskrit Version of Sahyādrikhaṇḍa and in copies of same Khaṇḍa found in South India, do not have any reference about Chitpāvanas) 
The origin of Karhāḍa Brāhmaṇas (not a part of the Sanskrit version)
The Glory of Gomañcalakṣetra
The origin of different groups of Brāhmaṇas of Dakṣiṇa
The consideration of Brāhmaṇas 
In the praise of land grants
Demarcation of the villages
The praise composed by Bhārgava
Demarcation of inferior villages
Title not given-related to thirty-two villages
Story of fallen villages
Three chapters related to demarcation of fallen villages
Title not specified-related to the river Sitā
The story of Mithunāhara  Brāhmaṇas
The story of fallen village
The fallen village
The glory of the Kṣetra
The glory of Mahālingeśa

References

Further reading 
 Reflections on the Sahyādrikhaṇḍa's Uttarārdha

Puranas

kn:ಸ್ಕಾಂದ ಪುರಾಣ
mr:स्कंद पुराण